HMS Ardent was one of 20 s built for the Royal Navy in the 1910s. Completed in 1914 she saw active service in the First World War, and was sunk at the Battle of Jutland in 1916.

Design and description
Ardent was ordered to evaluate William Denny & Brothers' recently developed longitudinal framing method of building which offered greater hull strength for a given weight than conventional transverse construction. The ships displaced  at deep load and their crew numbered 73 officers and ratings.

The destroyers were powered by a single Parsons steam turbine that drove two propeller shafts using steam provided by Yarrow boilers. Ardent differed from her sister ships in that she had only three rather than four boilers and only two funnels. The ship reached a speed of  during her sea trials.

The primary armament of the ships consisted of three BL  Mk VIII guns in single, unprotected pivot mounts. Ardent had one gun on the forecastle, one on a platform between her funnels and the third aft of the superstructure. The destroyers were equipped with a pair of single rotating mounts for 21-inch (533 mm) torpedo tubes amidships and carried two reload torpedoes.

Construction and career
HMS Ardent, the seventh Royal Navy ship to bear the name,
was ordered under the 1911–1912 Naval Programme from William Denny & Brothers. The ship was laid down at the company's Dumbarton shipyard on 9 October 1911, launched on 8 September 1912 and commissioned in February 1914. She joined the 4th Destroyer Flotilla on completion, and served with the Grand Fleet on the outbreak of the First World War.

She was sunk on 1 June 1916 during the Battle of Jutland by secondary fire from the German dreadnought . Seventy-eight men went down with the ship; there were only two survivors.

The wrecksite is designated as a protected place under the Protection of Military Remains Act 1986.

Pennant numbers

Notes

Citations

Bibliography

External links 
 Battle of Jutland Crew Lists Project - HMS Ardent Crew List

 

Acasta-class destroyers
World War I destroyers of the United Kingdom
Maritime incidents in 1916
Ships sunk at the Battle of Jutland
Protected Wrecks of the United Kingdom
1913 ships